Gong Lijiao (born 24 January 1989) is a Chinese Olympic shot putter.

Career
She finished seventh at the 2007 World Championships, her international debut. At the 2008 Summer Olympics she finished fifth but received the bronze medal later after two competitors were stripped of their medals because of doping violations.

She set a personal best throw of 19.46 metres in the qualifying round of the 2008 Olympics; this was the furthest mark for a female Chinese shot putter for over a decade. At the 2009 National Games of China, Gong further improved her personal best to 19.82 m, taking her to tenth place on the all-time Chinese shot putter's list.

She won the bronze medal at the 2009 World Championships in Berlin with a personal best of 19.89 metres.

She won the gold medal at the 2009 National Games of China in Jinan with a personal best of 20.35 metres.

She won the gold medal at the 2009 Asian Athletics Championships in Guangzhou with a personal best of 19.04 metres.

She initially finished fourth in the London 2012 Summer Olympics, but was retroactively awarded the bronze medal after the winner, Nadzeya Astapchuk, was disqualified for failing a drug test. On 20 August 2016, the IOC announced Yevgeniya Kolodko, the Russian silver medalist of women's shot put, failed an anti-doping test. Gong therefore got the silver medal.

In 2018, Gong won the Gold Medal on Women's Shot Put during the 18th Asian Games in Jakarta, Indonesia .

In 2021, she won the gold medal in women's shot put at the 2020 Summer Olympics In Tokyo with her personal best of 20.58 m, thereby becoming the first Chinese athlete to be crowned the Olympic champion in any field event and the first athlete from Asia to win an Olympic gold medal in women's shot put.

References

1989 births
Living people
Athletes from Hebei
Sportspeople from Shijiazhuang
Chinese female shot putters
Olympic athletes of China
Olympic gold medalists for China
Olympic silver medalists for China
Olympic bronze medalists for China
Athletes (track and field) at the 2008 Summer Olympics
Athletes (track and field) at the 2012 Summer Olympics
Athletes (track and field) at the 2016 Summer Olympics
Athletes (track and field) at the 2020 Summer Olympics
Medalists at the 2008 Summer Olympics
Medalists at the 2012 Summer Olympics
Medalists at the 2020 Summer Olympics
Asian Games gold medalists for China
Asian Games silver medalists for China
Asian Games medalists in athletics (track and field)
Athletes (track and field) at the 2010 Asian Games
Athletes (track and field) at the 2014 Asian Games
Athletes (track and field) at the 2018 Asian Games
World Athletics Championships athletes for China
World Athletics Championships medalists
Olympic gold medalists in athletics (track and field)
Olympic silver medalists in athletics (track and field)
Olympic bronze medalists in athletics (track and field)
Medalists at the 2010 Asian Games
Medalists at the 2014 Asian Games
Medalists at the 2018 Asian Games
World Athletics Championships winners
Diamond League winners
Asian Athletics Championships winners
IAAF Continental Cup winners
Asian Games gold medalists in athletics (track and field)
21st-century Chinese women